In kinematics, the parallel motion linkage is a six-bar mechanical  linkage invented by the Scottish engineer James Watt in 1784 for the double-acting Watt steam engine. It allows a rod moving practically straight up and down to transmit motion to a beam moving in an arc, without putting significant sideways strain on the rod.

Description

In previous engines built by Newcomen and Watt, the piston pulled one end of the walking beam downwards during the power stroke using a chain, and the weight of the pump pulled the other end of the beam downwards during the recovery stroke using a second chain, the alternating forces producing the rocking motion of the beam. In Watt's new double-acting engine, the piston produced power on both the upward and downward strokes, so a chain could not be used to transmit the force to the beam. Watt designed the parallel motion to transmit force in both directions whilst keeping the piston rod very close to vertical. He called it "parallel motion" because both the piston and the pump rod were required to move vertically, parallel to one another.

In a letter to his son in 1808 describing how he arrived at the design, James Watt wrote "I am more proud of the parallel motion than of any other invention I have ever made." The sketch he included actually shows what is now known as Watt's linkage which was a linkage described in Watt's 1784 patent but it was immediately superseded by the parallel motion.

The parallel motion differed from Watt's linkage by having an additional pantograph linkage incorporated in the design. This did not affect the fundamental principle but it allowed the engine room to be smaller because the linkage was more compact.

The Newcomen engine's piston was propelled downward by the atmospheric pressure, and raised by live steam. Watt's device allowed live steam to be used for direct work on both sides of the piston, thus almost doubling the power, and also delivering the power more evenly through the cycle, an advantage when converting the reciprocating motion to rotary motion (whether through a crank or through a Sun and planet gear system).

Principle of operation

As the beam rocks, point  (which is drawn to aid this explanation, but is not a marked point on the machine itself) describes an elongated figure-eight (more precisely, a lemniscate of Bernoulli) in mid-air. Since the motion of the walking beam is constrained to a small angle,  describes only a short section of the figure-eight, which is quite close to a vertical straight line.

It would have been possible to connect  directly to the piston rod (the "Watt's linkage" design), but this would have made the machine an awkward shape, with  a long way from the end of the walking beam. To avoid this, Watt added the parallelogram linkage  to form a pantograph. The addition of the pantograph made the mechanism shorter and so the building containing the engine could be smaller.

Watt's design produced a deviation of about one part in 4000 from a straight line. Later, in the 19th century, perfect straight-line linkages were invented, beginning with the Peaucellier–Lipkin linkage of 1864.

See also 

Pantograph, part of what the Parallel motion linkage uses.
Straight line mechanism
Watt's linkage, the core of how the Parallel motion linkage works.

References 

General
 Linkages article in Encyclopædia Britannica, 1958.
 Parallel Motion article in Encyclopædia Britannica, 1911.
 Robert Stuart, A Descriptive History of the Steam Engine, London, J. Knight and H. Lacey, 1824.

Further reading

 How Round Is Your Circle? (Bryant and Sangwin, 2008) contains a chapter about James Watt's parallel motion mechanism

Beam engines
Technical drawing
Scottish inventions
Linkages (mechanical)
Straight line mechanisms